Jimmy Reardon (18 October 1925 – 20 June 2019) was an Irish sprinter who competed in the 1948 Summer Olympics. He was the first Irish athlete to be offered a scholarship to attend Villanova University in Pennsylvania, United States.

Competition record

References

1925 births
2019 deaths
Male sprinters from Northern Ireland
Olympic athletes of Ireland
Athletes (track and field) at the 1948 Summer Olympics